The Castello Utveggio is a monumental palace built 1928–1933 at a promontory of Mount Pellegrino overlooking Palermo, Sicily. The castle was built in a Neogothic architecture Neogothic-style resembling a castle with meliorated rooflines.

History
Construction of the castle or palace was commissioned by the Cavaliere Michele Utveggio, and designed by Giovanni Battista Santangelo. Viewed as a fancy, or folly building, the residence soon became a luxury hotel by the name of the Grand Hotel Utveggio, but it was closed during the Second World War. In 1984, the regional government bought and refurbished the structure to install a business management school under the direction of Cerisdi, the centro ricerche e studi direzionali. This closed in 2016.

References

Palaces in Palermo
Palazzo Utveggio